The 2015 Open BNP Paribas Banque de Bretagne was a professional tennis tournament played on hard courts. It was the fifth edition of the tournament which was part of the 2015 ATP Challenger Tour. It took place in Quimper, France between 2 and 8 March 2015.

Singles main-draw entrants

Seeds

1 Rankings as of February 23, 2015.

Other entrants
The following players received wildcards into the singles main draw:
  Grégoire Barrère
  Kenny de Schepper
  Maxime Teixeira
  Martin Vaïsse

The following players received entry from the qualifying draw:
  Teri Groll
  Edward Corrie
  Calvin Hemery
  Daniel Brands

The following players received entry as lucky losers:
  Andrés Artuñedo Martínavarro
  Sébastien Boltz
  Élie Rousset
The following players got into the singles main draw as a special exempt:
  Andriej Kapaś

Champions

Singles

 Benoît Paire def.  Grégoire Barrère, 6–4, 3–6, 6–4

Doubles

 Flavio Cipolla /  Dominik Meffert def.  Martin Emmrich /  Andreas Siljeström, 3–6, 7–6(7–5), [10–8]

External links
Official Website

Open BNP Paribas Banque de Bretagne
Open BNP Paribas Banque de Bretagne
2015 in French tennis